A witch-hunt is a search for suspected or alleged witches.

Witch hunt may also refer to:

Film
 The Witch Hunt, a 1981 Norwegian film
 Witch Hunt (1994 film), a television film
 Witch Hunt (1999 film), a film starring Jacqueline Bisset
 Witch Hunt (2008 film), a documentary about the Kern County child abuse cases
 Witch Hunt (2019 film), a documentary about the campaign against anti-semitism in the UK Labour Party

Television 
 "Witch Hunt" (Legends of Tomorrow), an episode of Legends of Tomorrow
 "Witch Hunt" (NCIS), an episode of NCIS
 Witch Hunt (Once Upon a Time), an episode of  Once Upon a Time
 "Witch Hunt" (Trinity Blood), an episode of Trinity Blood
 Witch Hunt (South Korean TV series), a South Korean TV series
 Witch Hunt (UK TV series), a 1967 British series

Music
 Witch Hunt (band), a punk band from Philadelphia
 "Witch Hunt" (Rush song)
 "Witch Hunt", a song by MDFMK from their self-titled album
 "Witch Hunt", a song by the Misfits from Famous Monsters
 "Witch Hunt", a song by Wayne Shorter from Speak No Evil
 Witch-Hunts, a 1998 album by Darkwoods My Betrothed
"Witch Hunt", a song by Jack Off Jill from Clear Hearts Grey Flowers

Other uses
 Witch Hunt (novel), a 1993 novel by Ian Rankin writing as Jack Harvey
 Witch Hunt (role-playing game), a 1983 role-playing game
 Witch-Hunt, a translation group for the sound novel Umineko no Naku Koro ni

See also
 Witch hunter (disambiguation)
 Witch trial (disambiguation)